Macrotyloma is a genus of plants in the legume family which include several species of edible beans. Some species are also used as fodder for livestock.

Species include:
Macrotyloma africanum (Brenan ex R. Wilczek) Verdc.
Macrotyloma axillare (E. Mey.) Verdc. - perennial horse gram
Macrotyloma daltonii 
Macrotyloma densiflorum 
Macrotyloma ellipticum 
Macrotyloma geocarpum - Kersting's groundnut, ground bean
Macrotyloma maranguense 
Macrotyloma oliganthum 
Macrotyloma rupestre 
Macrotyloma stenophyllum (Harms) Verdc.
Macrotyloma stipulosum 
Macrotyloma tenuiflorum 
Macrotyloma uniflorum (Lam.) Verdc. - horse gram, kulthi
M. uniflorum var. benadirianum (Chiov.) Verdc.

References

External links
Flora of Zimbabwe
GRIN Species List

Phaseoleae
Fabaceae genera